Georgia State Route 14 Alternate may refer to:

 Georgia State Route 14 Alternate (LaGrange): a former alternate route of State Route 14 that existed in LaGrange
 Georgia State Route 14 Alternate (Palmetto–Red Oak): an alternate route of State Route 14 that exists in Palmetto and Red Oak

014 Alternate